Than Phu Ying Busba Kitiyakara Sathanapong (born 2 August 1934) is the daughter of Mom Chao Nakkhatra Mangala Kitiyakara and younger sister of Thailand's Queen Mother Sirikit Kitiyakara.

Early life and education
Like her elder sister Sirikit, Busba was educated at Rajini School and St. Francis Xavier Convent.  During her childhood, her father was appointed Thai Ambassador to France, Denmark and the United Kingdom, and Busba continued her education in these countries with her sister, Sirikit.  After Sirikit's marriage to King Bhumibol in 1950, Busba became a palace fixture.

Family
Busba married Thawisan Ladawan in 1958 and had a daughter, Suthawan Ladawan Sathirathai on 24 September 1958.  They divorced soon afterwards.

She later married Captain Surayud Sathanapong.

Ancestry

References
 Handley, Paul M. (2006). The King Never Smiles. Yale University Press, .

1934 births
Living people
Busba Kitiyakara
Busba Kitiyakara